This is a list of George Floyd protests in Alaska, United States. Protests occurred in at least thirteen various communities in the state.

Locations

Anchorage 
Two peaceful demonstrations were held on May 30. A march, organized by a high school student via Instagram, began at Town Square. About a hundred protesters marched for about 45 minutes while chanting and holding signs. A rally, organized separately and attended by hundreds of people, took place in midtown where pastors and community activists spoke in solidarity for justice.

Bethel 
On June 2, a crowd of over 100 residents gathered at the Bethel Cultural Center and peacefully protested the murder of George Floyd. Protesters marched, carried signs and chanted, "I can't breathe" in support of the Black Lives Matter Movement.

Fairbanks 
On May 30, over 400 peaceful protesters took part in a rally and march from Veteran's Memorial Park to Golden Heart Plaza organized by the Fairbanks NAACP and the statewide group Native Movement.

Haines 
On June 2, an event drew approximately 200 people, where a moment of silence lasting eight minutes and 46 seconds was held, among other activities.

Homer 
More than 80 people attended a gathering on June 1 and 40 additional people on the next day. One young mother, whose children were in attendance, held a sign that read "Mama", one of Floyd's last words. The event was held at Wisdom, Knowledge, Faith & Love Park on Pioneer Avenue.

Juneau 
On May 30, people held signs decrying violence against black people and calling out institutional racism, many supporting the Black Lives Matter movement. June 6: Hundreds of vocal protesters gathered in Marine Park for a Black Lives Matter rally followed by a march to Douglas Bridge to drop flowers in the water.

Ketchikan 
Protesters demonstrated at the corner of Tongass Avenue and Jefferson Street on June 3.

Kodiak
In Kodiak on June 4, dozens of people gathered, carrying signs and showing support for George Floyd and the Black Lives Matter movement.

Kotzebue 
At least 20 people marched through Kotzebue on June 2.

Nome 
150 people gathered for a protest across from town hall on June 10.

Palmer 
1,400 people peacefully gathered and marched in the town's historic downtown on June 6 with a call to end racism and to protest the murder of George Floyd.

Sitka 
Around 250 local residents gathered in Totem Square on June 1, the attendees shared in a seven-minute moment of silence and two traditional :Tlingit songs of peace.

Soldotna 
On June 3, around 50 people gathered at Soldotna Creek Park and marched to the intersection at Sterling Highway and Kenai Spur Highway to demand justice for George Floyd.

Utqiaġvik 
People  met at the whale bone arch near the Top of the World Hotel in Utqiaġvik on June 6 to protest the murder of Floyd and police brutality.  Protesters raised their fists in solidarity and observed a moment of silence for eight minutes.  One of the organizers also expressed hope for police reform, including demilitarizing the police and banning the use of chokeholds such as the knee-on-neck choke.

References 

2020 in Alaska
Events in Alaska
Alaska
June 2020 events in the United States
May 2020 events in the United States